Karla Tritten (born April 17, 1978) is a Canadian Paralympic wheelchair basketball player and physical education teacher at the Balwin Junior High School, a department of Victoria School of the Arts.  , she resides in Sturgeon County.

Career
Tritten is four-time bronze medalist for 2007 Nations Tournament. In 2006, she was awarded with her first gold medal for her participation at Quebec AAA Championships, and the same year got her first silver medal for Junior National Championships. In 2007 she was honoured with a gold medal for her participation at the 2007 Canada Games and the same year got 2 silver medals for a National championship and the 2007 Parapan American Games. In 2008, Tritten was awarded 2 gold medals; one for her participation at the invitational game in Beijing, China the other one was given after she completed the North American Cup. In 2010 she won bronze medal for CWBL Women's Finals and the same year got a silver one for the championship.

References

1989 births
Living people
Medalists at the 2004 Summer Paralympics
Paralympic bronze medalists for Canada
Paralympic wheelchair basketball players of Canada
Wheelchair basketball players at the 2004 Summer Paralympics
Paralympic medalists in wheelchair basketball